Let It Die is the second album by Canadian singer-songwriter Feist. It was recorded in Paris during 2002 and 2003 and released in 2004. The album combines jazz, bossa nova and indie rock.

Background
Let It Die was welcomed as one of the best Canadian pop albums of 2004. It was nominated for three Juno Awards in 2005, and won two: Best Alternative Album and Best New Artist. A track from the album, "Inside and Out", was nominated as Single of the Year in the 2006 Juno Awards. In 2012, NOW Magazine ranked Let It Die at No. 4 on list of The 50 Best Toronto Albums Ever.

Let It Die has attracted a significant international audience. The album was originally divided into original compositions on the first half and cover versions on the second, though a reissue later in 2004 added a further original composition as the penultimate track.

The single "Mushaboom" is a pun on sh-Boom as a refrain, and the Mushaboom, the Canadian coastal community east of Halifax, Nova Scotia, the province where Feist was born. The song was used in a Lacoste commercial.

Composition

Music and lyrics 
Barry Walters of Rolling Stone likened Feist's vocals on the album to "the jazz tingle of Peggy Lee", and her melodicism to Tin Pan Alley. Walters also believed Let It Die to draw influence from chamber pop, chill-out, postmodern folk, and Burt Bacharach, and described the album as "indie lounge pop".

Let It Die contains elements of folk, bossa nova, and indie rock.

Critical reception

MacKenzie Wilson of AllMusic gave praise to the various production choices on the tracks and the vocal work over it, saying that "[S]he's playful with her design and the overall composition flows nicely. Feist has varied styles and sounds just right, and that's what makes Let It Die the secret treasure that it is." Barry Walters, writing for Rolling Stone, also lauded praise for the album's eclectic genre and vocal dynamics, saying that "Feist proves she's a modern gal with a sparse yet varied sound that draws from chamber pop, chill-out, postmodern folk, Burt Bacharach and beyond."

At the 2017 Polaris Music Prize, the album won the public vote for the Heritage Prize in the 1996–2005 category.

Track listing

Personnel
 Gonzales – piano, various instruments
 Feist – guitar, vocals
 Julien Chirol – trombone
 Frédéric Couderc – saxophone

Charts

Certifications and sales

References

2004 albums
Feist (singer) albums
Arts & Crafts Productions albums
Polydor Records albums
Juno Award for Alternative Album of the Year albums